Sonny Skinner (born August 18, 1960) is an American professional golfer who plays on the Champions Tour.

Skinner was born in Portsmouth, Virginia. He turned professional in 1982.

Skinner joined the PGA Tour in 1990 after going through qualifying school. He played on the Ben Hogan Tour in 1991 after a poor performance in his rookie year on the PGA Tour. He went through qualifying school again in 1991 and returned to the PGA Tour in 1992. He returned to the Nationwide Tour in 1993 where he won the first event he entered, the NIKE Shreveport Open. He picked up his second win on Tour in 1994 at the NIKE Dominion Open. He played on the Nationwide Tour until earning his PGA Tour card through qualifying school for the third time in 1996. In the 1997 Buick Open, he tied the course record at the Warwick Hills Golf Course with a 62 but Billy Mayfair shot a 61 in 2001 to break the record. He failed to retain his card in 1997 but went through qualifying school for a fourth time to earn his card for 1998. He returned to the Nationwide Tour in 1999 where he would play full-time until 2004. He played on the Nationwide Tour part-time until 2010.

Skinner joined the Champions Tour in 2010 once he turned 50.

Skinner was named the PGA Professional of the Year in 2008 and the Senior PGA Professional of the Year in 2010, becoming the first person to win both awards. He is a PGA teaching professional at the River Pointe Golf Club in Albany, Georgia.

Skinner has been inducted into the Abraham Baldwin Agrircultural College Athletic Hall of Fame, the Shorter College Athletic Hall of Fame, and the Georgia Golf Hall of Fame.

Professional wins (4)

Nike Tour wins (2)

Nike Tour playoff record (1–1)

Other wins (2)
2009 Georgia PGA Championship
2012 Georgia PGA Championship

Results in major championships

CUT = missed the half-way cut
Note: Skinner only played in the PGA Championship.

U.S. national team appearances
PGA Cup: 2009 (winners), 2011 (winners)

See also
1989 PGA Tour Qualifying School graduates
1991 PGA Tour Qualifying School graduates
1996 PGA Tour Qualifying School graduates
1997 PGA Tour Qualifying School graduates

External links

American male golfers
PGA Tour golfers
PGA Tour Champions golfers
Golfers from Virginia
Golfers from Georgia (U.S. state)
Sportspeople from Portsmouth, Virginia
People from Sylvester, Georgia
1960 births
Living people